Shamim Kaisar Lincoln is a Bangladesh Nationalist Party politician and the former Member of Parliament of Gaibandha-4.

Career
Lincoln was elected to parliament from Gaibandha-4 as a Bangladesh Nationalist Party candidate in May 2006 by-election following the death of incumbent Abdul Mottaleb Akanda.

References

Bangladesh Nationalist Party politicians
Living people
8th Jatiya Sangsad members
People from Gaibandha District
1980 births
Dhaka College alumni